The Foundation for the cultural heritage of Italian Cities (CittàItalia Foundation) is an Italian non-profit organization whose aims are: to raise public awareness to save Italian heritage and to support art. The foundation was set up on 30 June 2003 by the Mecenate 90 Association, a number of art cities and banking foundations.

External links
 Official web-site 

Cultural heritage of Italy
Cultural organisations based in Italy
Foundations based in Italy